Forest Hill Collegiate Institute (FHCI) is a semestered public high school in Toronto, Ontario, Canada. It is located in the  Forest Hill neighbourhood. Having about 900 students and 55 teachers, it is part of the Toronto District School Board. Prior to 1998, it was within the Toronto Board of Education (TBE).

The school takes pride in its wide range of clubs, committees, teams and student spirit.

The motto for the school is Non nobis solum ("Not for Ourselves Alone").

History
The history of Forest Hill Collegiate began in January 1948 when the first Grade 9 classes attended Forest Hill Village Public School. The school received its own building when it first officially opened on September 29, 1949 by the Forest Hill Board of Education. This post-war modern school is designed by architects Page and Steele.

In 1992, Forest Hill C.I. underwent major renovations and was completed in March 1994. Page and Steele provided by the renovations and design.

Student leadership

Student Council
The Student Council executive is selected in spring by an election for the next year following election campaigns and assemblies. Executives positions include President, Vice-President, Treasurer/Secretary, Social Representative, Sports Representative, Grade Representatives and Junior Vice-President. The Student Council carries out and plans activities such as Hillstock.

School Prefects
Selection for the school Prefect positions is held in the spring for the following year. Teachers vote on who will be selected. Twenty-five to thirty-five student Prefects are typically chosen. They host events such as grade 8 orientation days, concerts, curriculum information nights, commencement, etc. They also come early to school and stay late for events such as the annual Pancake Breakfast and the Parent/Teacher Interviews. The names of each year's Prefects are engraved on wood plaques and can be found in the music hallway.

Music Directorate
The Music Directorate is a student group that manages music-related activities. Positions include president, vice-president, treasurer, secretary, band representative, strings representative, vocal representative, stage crew manager, student council liaison and members at large.

Production Crew 
A team of students that put together productions key to the school such as Storm, Celebration of Music, Hillstock and many more. The team gives an opportunity for people interested in the "behind the scenes" aspects to learn about lights, stage and sound. Positions of the executive team include President, Head of Stage, Head of Sound and Head of Lights.

Clubs
The school has many student-run clubs and activities such as Athletic Council, Black Student Alliance, GO Club, COPE Council, Peer Mentors and Peer Tutors, Sports Management Club, Chess Club, the Politics and History Club, DECA FHCI Business and Entrepreneurship Club, Debate Club, Jewish Culture Club, Math Club, Science Club, Cubing Club, Law and Politics Club, Movie Club, Anime Club, Gender Sexuality Alliance Club, Art Club, Dragon Club, and the FHCI Transit Planning Committee etc.

Co-operative program
FHCI offers a cooperative program that allows students in grades 11 and 12 to gain work experience.  Each student that participates in this program receives 2.0 credits out of 4.0 for one semester.  Students are able to choose the field in which they want to work and in turn get matched by the supervising faculty member.  Students put both working hours and class hours into the program.

Events
School events include:
Hillstock, a celebration for students and staff to celebrate the end of a school year. Students usually receive yearbooks on this day. It is tradition that the Student Council and Prefects plans Hillstock and manage its operations, 
Prom takes place on the last Thursday of May, with Hillstock occurring the day after,
Commencement (graduation) takes place on the Thursday before the week of Thanksgiving in October,
United Way Week and The Funky Dance Marathon,
One musical production per semester featuring Strings, Band and Vocal ensembles. The winter concert called "Celebration of Music" is held in December and the spring concert called "Sounds of Spring" is held in May.
Pink Day, in support of anti-bullying. Toronto Police Chief Bill Blair attended the school's Pink Day assembly as his last appearance before stepping down.

Notable alumni
Robert Bateman, artist/naturalist
Ralph Benmergui, radio and television host
Neve Campbell, actress
Noah Cappe, host of "The Bachelor Canada" television show and the television show "Carnival Eats"
Ken Daniels, Sportscaster & Current Detroit Red Wings play-by-play announcer
Drake (Aubrey Graham) (born 1986), rapper and actor
Sharon Fichman (born 1990), Canada's no.1 ranked doubles tennis player, dual Israeli citizen
Rainbow Sun Francks, Canadian actor
Shenae Grimes, actress (90210)
Lisi Harrison, author
Kenny Hotz and Spencer Rice of Kenny vs. Spenny, Canadian comedy reality TV duo
Mia Kirshner (born 1975), actress, writer, and social activist
Michael Landsberg, M.S.M., television personality
Lorne Michaels (born Lorne David Lipowitz, 1944), C.M., Canadian-American Saturday Night Live Executive Producer and writer, comedian, and actor
Joe Mimran, founder of Club Monaco and Joe Fresh, fashion designer and entrepreneur; regular on The Dragon's Den
Vladimir Kuljanin, Canadian National Basketball Team, NC Wilmington 
Howard Lindzon, author and founder of StockTwits
Sophie Milman, Juno Award-winning jazz singer
David Rakoff writer, comedian, and contributor to Public Radio International's This American Life
Dan Senor, columnist, writer, and political advisor
Bernard "Barry" Sherman, former billionaire Chairman and CEO of Apotex Inc.
Howard Shore, composer, three-time Academy Award winner for The Lord of the Rings
Dan Signer, television writer-producer
Gail Simmons, Judge on the television show Top Chef and host of its spin-off "Top Chef: Just Desserts"
Tara Strong, voice actress and actress. 
 Syrus Marcus Ware, artist, activist, and scholar. Co-founder of Black Lives Matter-Canada.

See also
List of high schools in Ontario

References

High schools in Toronto
Schools in the TDSB
Educational institutions established in 1948
1948 establishments in Ontario
Toronto District School Board